Teng Haining (born 25 June 1993) is a Chinese athlete who specialises in the middle-distance events. He won the silver medal in the 800 metres at the 2011 Summer Universiade and 2014 Asian Games.

His 800 metres personal best of 1:46.32 is the current national record.

Competition record

Personal bests
Outdoor'
800 metres – 1:46.32 (Beijing 2014)
1500 metres – 3:42.05 (Hefei 2011)

References

1993 births
Living people
Chinese male middle-distance runners
Athletes (track and field) at the 2014 Asian Games
Asian Games medalists in athletics (track and field)
Universiade medalists in athletics (track and field)
Asian Games silver medalists for China
Medalists at the 2014 Asian Games
Universiade silver medalists for China
Medalists at the 2011 Summer Universiade